Oxfordshire Constabulary was the Home Office police force for the county of Oxfordshire, England, excluding the city of Oxford itself, from 1857 until 1968.

History
Oxfordshire Constabulary was established in 1857. It absorbed Chipping Norton Borough Police and Henley Borough Police immediately. Banbury Borough Police was also amalgamated into the force 69 years later in 1925. In 1965 it had an establishment of 423 and an actual strength of 297.

On 1 April 1968 Oxfordshire Constabulary was amalgamated with Buckinghamshire Constabulary, Berkshire Constabulary, Oxford City Police and Reading Borough Police to form Thames Valley Constabulary.

Chief Constables
1857–1888: Captain Charles Mostyn Owen
1888–1917: Lieutenant-Colonel the Hon. Edward Alexander Holmes à Court (died 1923)
1917-1920: Major Douglas Roberts (died 1920)
1921–1940: Captain Ernest Kennaway Arbuthnot
1940–1944: Colonel Sir Eric St Johnston (afterwards Chief Constable of Durham, 1944–50)
1945–1954: Lt.-Col. Herman Rutherford (afterwards Chief Constable of Lincolnshire, 1954–56)
1954-1964: James Edward Bailey (died 1964)
1964-?: David Holdsworth
1968 : Merged with other forces to form Thames Valley Police

See also
List of defunct law enforcement agencies in the United Kingdom

Footnotes

References

Defunct police forces of England
Constabulary
Constabulary
Government agencies established in 1857
1968 disestablishments in England
1857 establishments in England